Cyborg is a 1982 video game published by Computer Shack.

Gameplay
Cyborg is a science fiction game in which gladiators compete against each other in a large open testing arena where obstacles and small mazes conceal targets for scoring points.

Reception
Dick McGrath reviewed the game for Computer Gaming World, and stated that "Cyborg is an interesting, challenging arcade game with beautifully smooth action graphics. I give it a 7.5 out of 10."

References

External links
Article in 80-U.S.

1982 video games
Action video games
Maze games
Science fiction video games
TRS-80 games
TRS-80-only games
Video games about cyborgs
Video games developed in the United States